Castleblayney railway station was on the Dundalk and Enniskillen Railway in the Republic of Ireland.

The Dundalk and Enniskillen Railway opened the station on 17 July 1854.

It closed on 14 October 1957.

Routes

References

Castleblayney
Disused railway stations in County Monaghan
Railway stations opened in 1849
Railway stations closed in 1957
1849 establishments in Ireland

Railway stations in the Republic of Ireland opened in 1849